Škan is an American extreme metal band formed in 2013.

Biography
Škan began as the solo studio project of Joseph Merino on November 11 of 2011. On November 2 of 2013, Škan was formed as a live entity. Škan's self released an EP, entitled "The Old King”, on the 11th of November 2013, which quickly gained a loyal following and praise from many supporters across the world who appreciated the uncompromising sound and vision. Featuring in many online press reviews the EP was well received with standout tracks like “The Eye" that lead to Škan's live assaults, proving Škan as a formidable entity among long standing metal titans. In the months that followed Škan unleashed it's ritualistic live shows alongside international acts like Danzig, Voivod, Portal, Moonspell, Saturnalia Temple, Cult of Fire, and many more in the U.S. as well as the U.K.

In 2015 Ron Van Herpen (ZooN / Astrosoniq / The Devil's Blood) and Rob Zim (The Lords of Altamont) entered Škan, soon after which EP I and II of a four EP set were released by Ván Records as a limited edition series which is to be followed up by the release of EP's III and IV, as well as a full-length debut album.

Endorsements:

• Seymour Duncan
• Randall Amplifiers
• Dream Cymbals

Current members
Joseph Merino: Guitars, Vocals 
Ron van Herpen: Guitars 
Rob Zim: Bass 
David Baxter: Drums, Percussions

Discography
Studio albums
The Old King (EP) (© DEATH CROWN 2013)
PART I of IV (Ván Records March 11, 2016)
Part II of IV (Ván Records March 11, 2016)

Cultural references
The name Škan (see Skan) originates from the Lakota language.

References

- "INTERVIEW WITH JOSEPH MERINO: ŠKAN", by KASSANDRA CARMONA of The Offering Webzine (July 2015)
 - "Škan" interview by Blackened Death Metal Zine (June 2014)
 - "The Old King" EP review by Blackened Death Metal Zine (June 2014)
 - "Best newcomer of 2013 Explored, part 2" - Metal Underground (January 2014)
 - Nominated "Best new bands of 2013" - Metal Underground (December 2013)
 - "Škan" interview by Metal Titans (November 2013)
 - "Škan" interview by Blackened Horde Zine (December 2013)
 - "The Old King" EP review by Metal Titans (November 2013)
 - "The Old King" EP review by Blackened Horde (November 2013)
 - Encyclopaedia Metallum

External links

Musical groups established in 2011
Blackened death metal musical groups
American death metal musical groups
Musical groups from Austin, Texas
2011 establishments in Texas
Extreme metal musical groups